Marianne Rafferty is an overnight anchor and correspondent for Fox News.  She joined FNC in 2006 as a correspondent based in Fox's Atlanta bureau. While based in Atlanta, Rafferty covered Hurricane Dean's path from Jamaica and also reported on the Duke lacrosse case.

On September 2, 2016, Marianne Rafferty announced during the 5:00 p.m. broadcast she was leaving KFOR in Oklahoma City and moving to the west coast to be closer to family.

Biography
She joined Fox News Channel (FNC) in 2006 as a special correspondent with Fox News in the Atlanta, Georgia bureau.  She moved to Fox's New York bureau in late 2009, becoming an overnight anchor and correspondent

On May 30, 2009 she married Ian "Will" Rafferty in her hometown.  They have a son, born in early 2012.

On April 2, 2015, she was back in Oklahoma City anchoring the 4:00, 5:00, and 6:30 PM newscasts for KFOR-TV, NBC Channel 4.

As of September 8, 2016, she is no longer working for KFOR-TV.

References

Living people
American television news anchors
Fox News people
Bellarmine University alumni
1971 births
American women television journalists
21st-century American women